Roselyn Milagros Sánchez Rodríguez (born April 2, 1973) is a Puerto Rican singer-songwriter, dancer, model, actress, producer, and writer. On television, she is best known for her roles as Elena Delgado on the CBS police procedural Without a Trace (2005–09), as Carmen Luna on the Lifetime comedy-drama Devious Maids (2013–16), and as Elena Roarke on the new Fantasy Island (2021–present). In film, Sánchez has appeared in Rush Hour 2 (2001), Boat Trip (2002), The Game Plan (2007), and Act of Valor (2012).

Early life
Sánchez was born in San Juan, Puerto Rico, and is the youngest of four siblings, having three older brothers. She received her primary education in San Juan. At a young age, she showed an interest in both dancing and acting and would put on shows for her family. Sánchez enrolled in the University of Puerto Rico, where like her father and brothers she was to study marketing. However, after three years she left the course. In 1991, at the age of eighteen, Sánchez moved to New York City, where she took classes in dancing, acting and singing. She returned to Puerto Rico and, in 1992, she made her movie debut, having landed a small part as an island girl in the movie Captain Ron, which was partly filmed in Puerto Rico.

Career
In Puerto Rico, Sánchez gained public attention as a dancer and as co-host of a variety show called Qué Vacilón. At that time, in 1993, Sánchez won the Miss Puerto Rico Petite contest and, in 1994, she won the international title of Miss American Petite, bringing her international fame. Sánchez has been named in numerous annual lists of beautiful women including Maxim Magazines "Hot 100" in 2001, 2002 and 2006; AskMen.com's "Top 99 Most Desirable Women" in 2005 and 2006; and FHMs "100 Sexiest Women" in 2005 and 2006.

In 2001, Sánchez was cast as Isabella Molina, an undercover United States Secret Service agent who was Jackie Chan's love interest in the hit movie Rush Hour 2. In 2003, she played the role of Lorena in the movie Chasing Papi, starring alongside Jaci Velasquez and Sofia Vergara. Sánchez has acted in some 20 movies, including as Maria in Edison and as Karen Lopez in Underclassman. She starred in the Puerto Rican film Cayo, released in 2005.

In 2003, her first musical recording, Borinqueña, was released. The album's first single, "Amor Amor", gained a lot of attention as well as a Latin Grammy nomination for Best Music Video. She appeared in Craig David's music videos "Hidden Agenda" and "Personal", and in the Fabolous video for the song "Make Me Better".

In the fall of 2005, Sánchez joined the cast of the CBS television series Without a Trace, where she played Agent Elena Delgado to 2009. She composed the musical Yellow, about a singer/dancer/actress who leaves Puerto Rico to hit the big time in New York, in which she played the principal part. The movie was filmed in 2005 and released in 2007. Also in 2007, she acted as Monique, the ballet teacher, in The Game Plan, and in 2009, starred in The Perfect Sleep, a neo-noir drama, co-starring Patrick Bauchau, Tony Amendola, Isaac Singleton, and Peter Lucas. In 2011, Sánchez made a guest appearance on TNT's Rizzoli & Isles, playing villainous attorney Valerie Delgado.

In 2012, Sánchez was cast opposite Ana Ortiz of ABC comedy-drama pilot Devious Maids, created by Marc Cherry. On May 14, 2012, the pilot was not picked to series by ABC for the 2012–13 United States network schedule. However, on June 22, 2012, Lifetime picked up the pilot with a thirteen-episode order. The series premiered June 23, 2013 on Lifetime.

Personal life
From August 9, 1998, to April 15, 2001, Sanchez was married to English actor, former boxer, and former model Gary Stretch. After her divorce, she started a relationship with Puerto Rican salsa singer Víctor Manuelle. In December 2005, she announced that she had ended their relationship.

Sanchez became engaged to actor Eric Winter in December 2007 after two years of dating and they married on 29 November 2008, in San Juan, Puerto Rico. They have two children together: a daughter, Sebella (born January 2012), and a son, Dylan (born November 2017).

Sánchez is the spokesperson of the Fundación de Niños San Jorge, which assists sick children from poor families.

Filmography

Film

Television

Music Videos

Discography
2003: Borinqueña

Singles

Accolades

See also

List of Puerto Ricans

References

External links

 
 

1973 births
Actresses from San Juan, Puerto Rico
American people of Puerto Rican descent
Hispanic and Latino American actresses
Living people
21st-century Puerto Rican women singers
Puerto Rican film actresses
Puerto Rican singer-songwriters
Puerto Rican soap opera actresses
Puerto Rican television actresses
Singers from San Juan, Puerto Rico
20th-century American actresses
21st-century American actresses
Women in Latin music